Buffy Sainte-Marie,  (born Beverly Sainte-Marie, February 20, 1941) is an Indigenous Canadian-American (Piapot Cree Nation) singer-songwriter, musician, composer, visual artist, educator, pacifist, and social activist. While working in these areas, her work has focused on issues facing Indigenous peoples of the Americas. Her singing and writing repertoire also includes subjects of love, war, religion, and mysticism. She has won recognition, awards and honours for her music as well as her work in education and social activism. Among her most popular songs are "Universal Soldier", "Cod'ine", "Until It's Time for You to Go", "Take My Hand for a While", "Now That the Buffalo's Gone", and her versions of Mickey Newbury's "Mister Can't You See" and Joni Mitchell's "The Circle Game". Her songs have been recorded by many artists including Donovan, Joe Cocker, Jennifer Warnes, Janis Joplin, and Glen Campbell.

In 1983, she became the first Indigenous American person to win an Oscar, when her song "Up Where We Belong", co-written for the film An Officer and a Gentleman, won the Academy Award for Best Original Song at the 55th Academy Awards. The song also won the Golden Globe Award for Best Original Song that same year.

In 1997, she founded the Cradleboard Teaching Project, an educational curriculum devoted to better understanding Native Americans.

Personal life
Sainte-Marie was born in 1941 on the Piapot 75 reserve in the Qu'Appelle Valley, Saskatchewan, Canada, to Cree parents. At age two or three she was taken from her parents as part of the Sixties Scoop - a government policy where Indigenous children were taken from their families, communities and cultures for placement in non-First Nations families. She was adopted by an American couple, Albert and Winifred Sainte-Marie, from Wakefield, Massachusetts. Though "visibly white", her adoptive mother, Winifred, "self-identified as part Mi'kmaq." She attended the University of Massachusetts Amherst earning degrees in teaching and Oriental philosophy; she graduated as one of the top ten members of her class.

In 1964, on a return trip to the Piapot Cree reserve in Canada for a powwow, she was welcomed and (in a Cree Nation context) adopted by the youngest son of Chief Piapot, Emile Piapot and his wife, Clara Starblanket Piapot, who added to Sainte-Marie's cultural value and place in native culture.

In 1968, she married surfing teacher Dewain Bugbee who is from Hawaii and they divorced in 1971. She married Sheldon Wolfchild from Minnesota in 1975; they have a son, Dakota "Cody" Starblanket Wolfchild. They divorced. She married Jack Nitzsche, her co-writer of Up Where We Belong on March 19, 1982; they were married for seven years. Sainte-Marie has characterized the relationship as abusive and controlling; she left their home in Los Angeles out of fear for her and her son's safety. She also blames Nitzsche for the stagnation of her career during this time.

Although not a Baháʼí herself, she became an active friend of the Baháʼí faith and has appeared at concerts, conferences and conventions of that religion. In 1992, she appeared in the musical event prelude to the Baháʼí World Congress, a double concert "Live Unity: The Sound of the World" in 1992 with video broadcast and documentary. In the video documentary of the event Sainte-Marie is seen on the Dini Petty Show explaining the Baháʼí teaching of progressive revelation. She also appears in the 1985 video Mona With The Children by Douglas John Cameron. However, while she supports a universal sense of religion, she does not subscribe to any particular religion.
I gave a lot of support to Baháʼí people in the '80s and '90s … Baháʼí people, as people of all religions, is something I'm attracted to … I don't belong to any religion. … I have a huge religious faith or spiritual faith but I feel as though religion … is the first thing that racketeers exploit. … But that doesn't turn me against religion …

Career

Sainte-Marie taught herself to play piano and guitar in her childhood and teen years. In college some of her songs, "Ananias", the Indian lament "Now That the Buffalo's Gone", and "Mayoo Sto Hoon" (a cover of a Hindi Bollywood song "Mayus To Hoon Waade Se Tere" sung by the Indian singer Mohammed Rafi from the 1960 movie Barsaat Ki Raat) were already in her repertoire.

1960s

In her early twenties she toured alone, developing her craft and performing in various concert halls, folk music festivals, and First Nations reservations across the United States, Canada, and abroad. She spent a considerable amount of time in the coffeehouses of downtown Toronto's old Yorkville district, and New York City's Greenwich Village as part of the early to mid-1960s folk scene, often alongside other emerging Canadian contemporaries, such as Leonard Cohen, Neil Young, and Joni Mitchell. (She also introduced Mitchell to Elliot Roberts, who became Mitchell's manager.)

In 1963, recovering from a throat infection, Sainte-Marie became addicted to codeine and recovering from the experience became the basis of her song "Cod'ine", later covered by Donovan, Janis Joplin, the Charlatans, Quicksilver Messenger Service, Man, the Litter, the Leaves, Jimmy Gilmer, Gram Parsons, Charles Brutus McClay, the Barracudas (spelled "Codeine"), the Golden Horde, Nicole Atkins and Courtney Love. Also in 1963, she witnessed wounded soldiers returning from the Vietnam War at a time when the U.S. government was denying involvement – which inspired her protest song "Universal Soldier", released on her debut album It's My Way on Vanguard Records in 1964, and later became a hit for both Donovan and Glen Campbell.

She was subsequently named Billboard magazine's Best New Artist. Some of her songs addressing the mistreatment of Native Americans, such as "Now That the Buffalo's Gone" (1964) and
"My Country 'Tis of Thy People You're Dying" (1964, included on her 1966 album), created controversy at the time. In 1967, she released Fire & Fleet & Candlelight, which contained her interpretation of the traditional Yorkshire dialect song "Lyke Wake Dirge". In 1968 she released her song "Take My Hand for a While" which was also later recorded by Glen Campbell and at least 13 other artists. Sainte-Marie's other well-known songs include "Mister Can't You See", (a Top 40 U.S. hit in 1972); "He's an Indian Cowboy in the Rodeo"; and the theme song of the movie Soldier Blue. She appeared on Pete Seeger's Rainbow Quest with Pete Seeger in 1965 and several Canadian Television productions from the 1960s to the 1990s, and other TV shows such as American Bandstand, Soul Train, The Johnny Cash Show and The Tonight Show Starring Johnny Carson; and sang the opening song "The Circle Game" (written by Joni Mitchell) in Stuart Hagmann's film The Strawberry Statement (1970) Then Came Bronson; episode 20 "Mating Dance for Tender Grass" (1970) sang and acted.

In the late 1960s, she used a Buchla synthesizer to record the album Illuminations, which did not receive much notice. It was the first totally quadraphonic electronic vocal album. 

She appeared in "The Heritage" episode of The Virginian, that first aired on October 30, 1968. She played a Shoshone woman who had been sent to be educated at school.

1970s 

In late 1975, Sainte-Marie received a phone call from  Sesame Street producer Dulcy Singer to appear on the show for a one-shot guest appearance. Sainte-Marie told Singer she had no interest in doing a children's TV show, but reconsidered after asking "Have you done any Native American programming?" According to Sainte-Marie, Singer wanted her to count and recite the alphabet but Buffy wanted to teach the show's young viewers that "Indians still exist". She regularly appeared on Sesame Street over a five-year period from 1976 to 1981. Sainte-Marie breastfed her first son, Dakota "Cody" Starblanket Wolfchild, during a 1977 episode, which is believed to be the first representation of breastfeeding ever aired on television.
Sesame Street aired a week of shows from her home in Hawaii in January 1978. Her closest friend from the Sesame Street cast was Alaina Reed, who played Olivia Robinson on the show.

In 1979, Spirit of the Wind, featuring Sainte-Marie's original musical score, including the song "Spirit of the Wind", was one of three entries that year at the Cannes Film Festival. The film is a docudrama about George Attla, the "winningest dog musher of all time", as the film presents him, with all parts played by Native Americans except one by Slim Pickens. The film was shown on cable TV in the early 1980s and was released in France in 2003.

1980s
Sainte-Marie began using Apple II and Macintosh computers as early as 1981 to record her music and later some of her visual art. The song "Up Where We Belong" (which Sainte-Marie co-wrote with Will Jennings and musician Jack Nitzsche) was performed by Joe Cocker and Jennifer Warnes for the film An Officer and a Gentleman. It received the Academy Award for Best Original Song in 1982. On January 29, 1983, Jennings, Nitzsche and Sainte-Marie won the Golden Globe Award for Best Original Song. They also won the BAFTA film award for Best Original Song in 1984. On the Songs of the Century list compiled by the Recording Industry Association of America in 2001, the song was listed at number 323. In 2020, it was included on Billboard magazine's list of the "25 Greatest Love Song Duets".

In the early 1980s one of her native songs was used as the theme song for the CBC's native series Spirit Bay. She was cast for the TNT 1993 telefilm The Broken Chain. It was shot entirely in Virginia. In 1989 she wrote and performed the music for Where the Spirit Lives, a film about native children being abducted and forced into residential schools.

In 1986, British pop band Red Box covered her song "Qu'Appele Valley, Saskatchewan" (shortened to just "Saskatchewan") on their debut album The Circle & the Square. The song originally appears on Sainte-Marie's 1976 album Sweet America.

1990s

Sainte-Marie voiced the Cheyenne character, Kate Bighead, in the 1991 made-for-TV movie Son of the Morning Star, telling the Indian side of the Battle of the Little Bighorn, where Sioux Chief Sitting Bull defeated Lt. Col. George Custer.

In 1992, after a sixteen-year recording hiatus, Sainte-Marie released the album Coincidence and Likely Stories. Recorded in 1990 at home in Hawaii on her computer and transmitted via modem through the Internet to producer Chris Birkett in London, England, the album included the politically charged songs "The Big Ones Get Away" and "Bury My Heart at Wounded Knee" (which mentions Leonard Peltier), both commenting on the ongoing plight of Native Americans (see also the book and film with the same name). Also in 1992, Sainte-Marie appeared in the television film The Broken Chain with Wes Studi and Pierce Brosnan along with First Nations Baháʼí Phil Lucas. Her next album followed up in 1996 with Up Where We Belong, an album on which she re-recorded a number of her greatest hits in more unplugged and acoustic versions, including a re-release of "Universal Soldier". Sainte-Marie has exhibited her art at the Glenbow Museum in Calgary, the Winnipeg Art Gallery, the Emily Carr Gallery in Vancouver and the American Indian Arts Museum in Santa Fe, New Mexico. In 1995, she provided the voice of the spirit in the magic mirror in HBO's Happily Ever After: Fairy Tales for Every Child, which featured a Native American retelling of the Snow White fairy tale.

Also in 1995, the Indigo Girls released two versions of Sainte-Marie's protest song "Bury My Heart at Wounded Knee" on their live album 1200 Curfews. The song appears toward the end of Disc One in a live format, recorded at the Atwood Concert Hall in the Alaska Center for the Performing Arts in Anchorage, Alaska. "Every word is true", Emily says in the introduction. The second, found at the end of Disc Two, is a studio recording.

In 1996, she started a philanthropic non-profit fund Nihewan Foundation for American Indian Education devoted to improving Native American students’ participation in learning. The word "Nihewan" comes from the Cree language and means "talk Cree", which implies "Be Your Culture".

Sainte-Marie founded the Cradleboard Teaching Project in October 1996 using funds from her Nihewan Foundation and with a two-year grant from the W.K. Kellogg Foundation of Battle Creek, Michigan. With projects across Mohawk, Cree, Ojibwe, Menominee, Coeur D'Alene, Navajo, Quinault, Hawaiian, and Apache communities in eleven states, partnered with a non-native class of the same grade level for Elementary, Middle, and High School grades in the disciplines of Geography, History, Social Studies, Music and Science and produced a multimedia curriculum CD, Science: Through Native American Eyes.

2000s

In 2000, Sainte-Marie gave the commencement address at Haskell Indian Nations University. In 2002 she sang at the Kennedy Space Center for Commander John Herrington, USN, a Chickasaw and the first Native American astronaut. In 2003 she became a spokesperson for the UNESCO Associated Schools Project Network in Canada.

In 2002, a track written and performed by Sainte-Marie, titled "Lazarus", was sampled by Hip Hop producer Kanye West and performed by Cam'Ron and Jim Jones of The Diplomats. The track is called "Dead or Alive". In June 2007, she made a rare U.S. appearance at the Clearwater Festival in Croton-on-Hudson, New York.

In 2008, a two-CD set titled Buffy/Changing Woman/Sweet America: The Mid-1970s Recordings was released, compiling the three studio albums that she recorded for ABC Records and MCA Records between 1974 and 1976 (after departing her long-time label Vanguard Records). This was the first re-release of this material. In September 2008, Sainte-Marie made a comeback onto the music scene in Canada with the release of her studio album Running for the Drum. It was produced by Chris Birkett (producer of her 1992 and 1996 best of albums). Sessions for this project commenced in 2006 in Sainte-Marie's home studio in Hawaii and in part in France. They continued until spring 2007.

2010s
In 2015, Sainte-Marie released the album Power in the Blood on True North Records. She had a television appearance on May 22, 2015, with Democracy Now! to discuss the record and her musical and activist career. On September 21, 2015, Power in the Blood was named the winner of the 2015 Polaris Music Prize.

Also in 2015, A Tribe Called Red released an electronic remix of Sainte-Marie's song, "Working for the Government".

In 2016, Sainte-Marie toured North America with Mark Olexson (bass), Anthony King (guitar), Michel Bruyere (drums), and Kibwe Thomas (keyboards).

In 2017, she released the single "You Got to Run (Spirit of the Wind)", a collaboration with fellow Polaris Music Prize laureate, Tanya Tagaq. The song was inspired by George Attla who is a champion dog sled racer from Alaska.

On November 29, 2019, a 50th-anniversary edition of Sainte-Marie's 1969 album, Illuminations, was released on vinyl by Concord Records, the company that bought Vanguard Records, the original publisher of the album.

She is the subject of Buffy Sainte-Marie: Carry It On, a 2022 documentary film by Madison Thomas. In the same year the National Arts Centre staged Buffy Sainte-Marie: Starwalker, a tribute concert of musicians performing Sainte-Marie's songs.

Blacklisting
Sainte-Marie said in a 2008 interview at the National Museum of the American Indian that she had been blacklisted by American radio stations and that she, Native Americans, and other Indigenous people in the Red Power movements were pushed out of the industry during the 1970s.

In a 1999 interview at Diné College with a staff writer with Indian Country Today, Sainte-Marie said, "I found out 10 years later, in the 1980s, that President Lyndon B. Johnson had been writing letters on White House stationery praising radio stations for suppressing my music" and "In the 1970s, not only was the protest movement put out of business, but the Native American movement was attacked."

As a result of being blacklisted which Sainte-Marie claims was led by (among others) Presidents Lyndon Johnson and Richard Nixon, FBI Director J. Edgar Hoover, and Nashville disc jockey Ralph Emery (following the release of I'm Gonna Be a Country Girl Again), Sainte-Marie said, "I was put out of business in the United States".

Honours and awards
Academy Award for Best Original Song – "Up Where We Belong" (1983)
Golden Globe Award for Best Original Song –  "Up Where We Belong" (1983)
BAFTA Award for Best Original Song Written for a Film –  "Up Where We Belong" (1983)
Honorary Doctor of Fine Arts – University of Massachusetts (1983)
Best International Artist (France; 1993)
Canadian Music Hall of Fame aka JUNO Hall of Fame – 1995 inductee
Honorary Doctor of Laws – University of Regina (1996)
 Juno Award – Aboriginal Recording of the Year for Up Where We Belong (1997)
 Gemini Award for Best Performance in a Television Special (1996 variety special, Up Where We Belong) (1997)
 Dove Award (Gospel; 1997)
Officer of the Order of Canada (1997)
Star on Canada's Walk of Fame (1998)
Honorary Doctor of Letters – Lakehead University (2000)
Honorary Doctor of Humanities – University of Saskatchewan (2003)
Honorary Doctor of Letters – Emily Carr Institute of Art and Design – (2007)
Honorary Doctor of Laws – Carleton University (2008)
Canadian Country Music Hall of Fame – 2009 inductee
Honorary Doctor of Music – University of Western Ontario (2009)
Juno Award – Aboriginal Recording of the Year for Running for the Drum (2009) 
Honorary Doctor – Wilfrid Laurier University (2010)
Honorary Doctor – Ontario College of Art and Design (2010)
Honorary Doctor of Letters – Wilfrid Laurier – Letters (2010)
Honorary Doctor of Fine Arts – Ontario College of Art and Design (2010)
Governor General's Performing Arts Award (2010)
Honorary Doctor of Letters – University of British Columbia (2012)
Americana Music Honors & Awards – Spirit of Americana/Free Speech in Music Award (2015)
Polaris Music Prize (2015) (for Power in the Blood)
Juno Award – Aboriginal Album of the Year (2016) (for Power in the Blood)
Juno Award – Contemporary Roots Album of the Year (2016) (for Power in the Blood)
Allan Waters Humanitarian Award, 2017
Juno Award – Indigenous music album of the year (2018) (for Medicine Songs)
Indigenous Music Awards – Best Folk Album (2018) (for Medicine Songs)
Indigenous Music Awards – Best Video (2018) (for The War Racket)
Frank Blythe Award for Media Excellence (2018)
Honorary Doctor of Laws – University of Toronto (2019)
Companion of the Order of Canada (2019)
Polaris Heritage Prize – It's My Way! (2020)
New stamp honours renowned singer-songwriter Buffy Sainte-Marie November 18, 2021

Date unknown
Screen Actors Guild Lifetime Achievement
American Indian College Fund Lifetime Achievement
Charles de Gaulle Award (France)
Sistina Award (Italy)

Other
 In 1979, the Supersisters trading card set was produced and distributed; one of the cards featured Sainte-Marie's name and picture.

Discography

Albums

Singles

Soundtrack appearances

Compilation albums

See also

First Nations music
Music of Canada
Baháʼí Faith and Native Americans

References

Further reading

External links

 
 Interview at byjeffburger.com
 Article at canadianbands.com
 Article at thecanadianencyclopedia.ca
Buffy Sainte-Marie's Cradleboard Teaching Project
Buffy Sainte Marie, Heyoka Magazine Paintings
Buffy Sainte-Marie: A Multimedia Life, documentary produced by CineFocus-Paquin Pictures
[https://www.innerviews.org/inner/buffy-sainte-marie Buffy Sainte-Marie interviewed by Innerviews, 2021]
Legendary Native American Singer-Songwriter Buffy Sainte-Marie – video report by Democracy Now!''

Short documentary Buffy (2010) at the National Film Board of Canada

American singer-songwriters
Canadian Music Hall of Fame inductees
1941 births
Living people
Canadian digital artists
Women digital artists
Canadian women folk singers
Canadian feminists
Canadian folk guitarists
Canadian women folk guitarists
Canadian pacifists
Canadian women singer-songwriters
Canadian women artists
Cree people
Feminist musicians
American people of First Nations descent
First Nations actresses
First Nations activists
First Nations artists
First Nations feminists
First Nations musicians
Best Original Song Academy Award-winning songwriters
Canadian Screen Award winners
Indspire Awards
Juno Award for Indigenous Music Album of the Year winners
Polaris Music Prize winners
Governor General's Performing Arts Award winners
Officers of the Order of Canada
Angel Records artists
MCA Records artists
Chrysalis Records artists
Vanguard Records artists
American adoptees
Canadian adoptees
University of Massachusetts Amherst College of Education alumni
Canadian expatriate musicians in the United States
20th-century Canadian guitarists
21st-century Canadian guitarists
20th-century First Nations people
21st-century First Nations people
20th-century American women singers
Canadian rock guitarists
Canadian folk singer-songwriters
Canadian women rock singers
Canadian country singer-songwriters
Canadian women country singers
Canadian country guitarists
21st-century Canadian women singers
Golden Globe Award-winning musicians
Juno Award for Contemporary Roots Album of the Year winners
Companions of the Order of Canada
Piapot Cree Nation
20th-century Canadian women singers
20th-century American singers
21st-century American women
20th-century women guitarists
21st-century women guitarists